is a song by Japanese musician Hikaru Utada. It was released as a double A-side single with the song "Letters" on May 9, 2002.

Background and development 

Since they debuted as a musician in 1998, Utada had worked as the primary or sole songwriter for their music. Beginning with their second album Distance (2001), Utada began to co-arrange songs, such as "Wait & See (Risk)", "Distance" and "Kettobase!" The bonus track on Distance, "Hayatochi-Remix", was arranged entirely by Utada. In March 2002, Hikaru Utada released "Hikari", the theme song for the game Kingdom Hearts. "Sakura Drops" was first announced as the theme song for the drama First Love in mid-February.

Promotion and release 

The song was used as the theme song for the TBS drama First Love, starring Atsuro Watabe and Kyoko Fukada. This was Utada's third composition to be used as a drama theme song, after "First Love" was used for Majo no Jōken (1999), and "Can You Keep a Secret?" for Hero (2001). The drama first aired in Japan on April 17, 2002.

On May 13, 2002, Utada performed the song live at Hey! Hey! Hey! Music Champ, a week before they performed the single's second A-side "Letters".

Utada performed the song during their Hikaru no 5 Budokan residency show in 2004, at their Utada United 2006 Japanese tour, during their international tour Utada: In the Flesh 2010 and at their two date concert series Wild Life in December 2010.

The song was noticed for its digital success in the burgeoning ringtone market in Japan, with 29% of the revenue they had received from the song coming from ringtones.

Music video 

A music video was released for the song, directed by their then husband Kazuaki Kiriya, who had directed all of their music videos since "Final Distance" (2001). The video clip was a mix of strongly colored CGI imagery of a fantasy forest and animals, as well as scenes of Utada standing in this forest. The imagery seen in the video was inspired by the works of Edo period artist Itō Jakuchū.

Usage and covers 

For the Disney on Ice production Let's Party! which debuted in 2009, an English language version of the song was used as a part of the set. After becoming aware of Disney's usage of the song in 2012, Utada was surprised, but honored that Disney had chosen to use their song.

In 2007, the band Kinmokusei covered "Sakura Drops" for their cherry blossom-themed album Sakura, and similarly in 2008 by Sotte Bosse for Blooming E.P.. In 2014, "Sakura Drops" was recorded by Yōsui Inoue for Utada Hikaru no Uta, a tribute album celebrating 15 years since Utada's debut. It was released as a preceding download from the album on December 3, 2014, and was commercially successful enough to reach number 68 on the Billboard Japan Hot 100 chart and number 11 on the Japanese Adult Contemporary Airplay chart. In Spring 2015, Inoue's cover recharted on the Adult Contemporary Airplay at number 41.

Critical reception 

Critical reception to the song was positive. Hayashi of Ongaku DB noted that the song was simultaneously elaborate and simple, praising the balance of this sound with a humble melody and Utada's passionate vocals, feeling that this mix was "natural, but at the same time miraculous". Akiyoshi Sekine of CDData praised the song's "simple but deep world view", while noting its "oriental taste" and "graceful sense of the season". Kanako Hanakawa of Backstage Pass felt that the cherry blossom imagery worked especially well because of Utada's vocal qualities.

CDJournal reviewers called the song "simple and fresh", and were surprised at how much more dark their style was in "Sakura Drops", considering how dark much of their music was already. They praised their vocal style and song arrangement, noting the "gleaming sound effects" and "tough melody" as highlights. Masamichi Yoshihiro of Yeah!! J-Pop! called the song a "classic pop tune", and noted the "J-Pop-style approach" of "Sakura Drops", also shared with their previous single "Hikari", which was stronger than anything seen before in their music, as opposed to their earlier R&B/club styled songs. He likened the song to those of Yumi Matsutoya, feeling its "straightforward emotional expression" and "pop arrangement" left the biggest impression. He felt that Utada's signature lyrics and vocals made the song stand out over other pop-genre songs.

Track listings

Personnel

Personnel details were sourced from Deep River's liner notes booklet.

Hironori Akiyama – electric guitar
Yuichiro Larry Honda – guitar sample
Goh Hotoda – recording
Kanno – guitar sample
Tsunemi Kawahide – synthesizer programming
Kei Kawano – acoustic piano, arrangement, keyboards, programming
Atsushi Matsui – recording
Akira Miyake – production
Masaaki Ugajin – recording
Hikaru Utada – arrangement, producer, writing, vocals
Teruzane "Sking" Utada – production

Charts

Sales and certifications

Release history

References 

2002 songs
2002 singles
Hikaru Utada songs
Japanese-language songs
Japanese television drama theme songs
Oricon Weekly number-one singles
Songs written by Hikaru Utada